Alexander Vraciu (November 2, 1918 – January 29, 2015) was a United States Navy fighter ace, Navy Cross recipient, and Medal of Honor nominee during World War II. At the end of the war, Vraciu ranked fourth among the U.S. Navy's flying aces, with 19 enemy planes downed during flight and 21 destroyed on the ground. After the war, he served as a test pilot and was instrumental in forming the post-war Naval and Marine Air Reserve program. From 1956 to 1958 Vraciu led his own fighter squadron, VF-51, for twenty-two months. He retired from the U.S. Navy with the rank of commander on December 31, 1963. Vraciu later moved to Danville, California, and worked for Wells Fargo.

Vraciu was born in East Chicago, Indiana, of Romanian immigrant parents. He graduated from DePauw University in Greencastle, Indiana,  and began his military career in 1941, when he enlisted in the U.S. Navy. During his military service in World War II, Vraciu flew Grumman F6F Hellcats in the Pacific, spending five months as a wingman to his mentor, Edward "Butch" O'Hare, the navy's first ace of the war. Vraciu's greatest success took place on June 19, 1944, during what became known as the "Great Marianas Turkey Shoot," when he engaged a Japanese bomber formation in air-to-air combat, downing six Japanese aircraft in eight minutes using only 360 rounds of ammunition. Vraciu spent the last few months of the war serving at the Naval Air Test Center in Patuxent, Maryland.

Early life, education and family

Vraciu was born in East Chicago, Indiana, on November 2, 1918, the second child and only son of Alexandru Sr. and Maria (née Tincu) Vraciu. Vraciu's parents immigrated from Transylvania, Romania at the turn of the century, settling in East Chicago, where they met and were married. (His father was born in Poiana Sibiului, and his mother was from Sebeș.) When Alex was seven or eight years old, the family traveled to Transylvania (Romania) for a brief residence. His parents hoped that the experience would immerse their children in the culture. Afterward, the family returned to Indiana, where Vraciu resumed his education, graduating from East Chicago's Washington High School in 1937.

Vraciu earned a four-year scholarship to DePauw University in Greencastle, Indiana, and graduated with a degree in sociology in 1941. At DePauw, Vraciu was active on the school's sports teams (track and football), became a member of the Delta Chi fraternity, and made the decision to become a pilot. During the summer between his junior and senior years in college, Vraciu participated in the Civilian Pilot Training Program (CPTP) at Muncie, Indiana, where he received a private pilot's license. On October 9, 1941, he enlisted as a naval aviator in the U.S. Navy Reserve.

Vraciu married Kathryn Horn on August 24, 1944. The couple had five children, three daughters and two sons. Kathryn died in 2003.

Naval career

Pilot training
Following Vraciu's naval enlistment in 1941, he reported to Glenview Naval Air Station in suburban Chicago for preliminary training as a pilot, and received additional pilot training at Dallas and Corpus Christi, Texas, in early 1942, and in San Diego, California, in 1943.

Vraciu was designated as a naval aviator and commissioned as a Naval Reserve ensign in August 1942, and promoted at the end of March 1943. While a cadet at NAS Corpus Christi in 1942, Vraciu had heard Lieutenant Commander Edward "Butch" O'Hare, the U.S. Navy's first ace, speak to the cadets. Now he heard that O'Hare was reforming Fighting Squadron 3 (VF-3) in San Diego, and by the flip of a coin, he got orders to report to VF-3. The squadron completed their carrier qualification (CQ) and catapult launches in their new F6F-3 Hellcats on board the escort carrier  by early June when Air Group Six was ordered to Hawaii. On June 14, the squadron boarded escort carrier , arriving at Pearl Harbor on the morning of June 22. By that afternoon, O'Hare had led his first 18 Hellcats to Pu'unene Naval Air Station on Maui. O'Hare chose Vraciu as his wingman and gave him valuable advice regarding air combat tactics. On July 15, all Air Group Six squadrons were renumbered with the number 6.

World War II service

Vraciu's first air-to air combat took place over Wake Island in October 1943, flying from the light aircraft carrier . Vraciu scored his first victory on October 5, 1943, when he and O'Hare encountered an enemy formation. O'Hare flew below the clouds to find a Japanese Mitsubishi Zero and Vraciu lost sight of him. Vraciu followed a second Zero to Wake Island, where it landed, and strafed the Zero on the ground. Vraciu also destroyed his first Mitsubishi G4M ("Betty") bomber while it was parked on the runway. During a mission in the Gilbert Islands (Makin and Tarawa atolls) on November 20, 1943, Vraciu downed a Betty bomber. (During his earlier training with O'Hare, Vraciu had learned to use the high side pass maneuver when attacking a Betty to avoid the lethal 20mm cannon wielded by its tail gunner.)

The ship's nickname of "The Evil I" because of its reputation for bad luck did not affect Vraciu's combat success; he began downing Japanese aircraft in multiples. On January 29, 1944, Vraciu shot down three Betty bombers, bringing his total number of downed enemy planes to five, achieving status as an ace. On February 17 he shot down four Japanese fighters over Truk Atoll. With nine victories, he became and remained VF-6's leading ace of the war. When USS Intrepid returned to Pearl Harbor for repairs in February 1944, Vraciu had an opportunity to rotate back to the United States, but he preferred to stay in the Pacific and requested additional combat duty. He joined VF-16 aboard  on February 27, 1944.

Vraciu's most successful day as an aviator occurred on June 19, 1944, during the First Battle of the Philippine Sea, also known as the "Great Marianas Turkey Shoot." Despite a malfunctioning supercharger, he intercepted a formation of Japanese dive bombers and destroyed six in a period of eight minutes. After Vraciu landed,  the ordnancemen on Lexington discovered that he had used only 360 rounds of ammunition. (On average, each of the six kills followed a burst lasting less than five seconds.) On June 20, 1944, while escorting bombers in an attack on the Japanese Mobile Fleet (Kido Butai), Vraciu downed his nineteenth plane, making him the leading U.S. Navy ace, although he held that title for only four months.  Vraciu was nominated for the Medal of Honor for his actions at the First Battle of the Philippine Sea; however, when the nomination reached the desk of Admiral George D. Murray at Pacific Fleet Headquarters in Hawaii, it was downgraded to a Navy Cross. Vraciu returned to the United States on leave in August 1944, and was promoted to a lieutenant upon his return to San Diego, California. Until he received orders for a new combat assignment, Vraciu made public appearances to promote the U.S. Navy in the United States.

Vraciu returned to combat in the Pacific in late 1944, flying Grumman F6F Hellcats in VF-20. On December 14, 1944, after two missions with VF-20, his plane was downed by anti-aircraft fire during a mission over the Philippines. Vraciu parachuted from his plane, landing in the Tarlac province of Luzon. He was rescued by Filipino resistance fighters, who appointed him a brevet major in command of a guerrilla unit. After spending five weeks with the guerrilla fighters, Vraciu rejoined American military forces and returned to USS Lexington. He spent the last few months of the war serving at the Naval Air Test Center in Patuxent, Maryland. Vraciu ended the war as the U.S. Navy's fourth highest ranking ace, credited with downing a total of nineteen enemy aircraft and destroying twenty-one on the ground.

Post war service
Following World War II, Vraciu was promoted to lieutenant commander and spent six years as a test pilot. He was instrumental in forming the post-war Naval and Marine Air Reserve program.

After staff assignments with the U.S. Navy in Washington, D.C., Vraciu became a jet training officer at Los Alamitos Naval Air Station in Orange County, California, and attended the Naval Post-Graduate School at Monterey, California. Promoted to commander, Vraciu led his own fighter squadron, VF-51, for twenty-two months,  from 1956 to 1958, and won the individual gunnery championship at the U.S. Navy's Air Weapons Meet at El Centro, California, in 1957.  Vraciu officially retired from the U. S. Navy on December 31, 1963, while serving as the public information officer at the Alameda Naval Air Station in Alameda, California.

Later years

After retiring from the U.S. Navy, Vraciu moved to Danville, California, where he worked for Wells Fargo bank. In retirement he continued to give public lectures to schools, businesses, and civic groups.

Vraciu appeared in "The Zero Killer" (2006), during season one, episode six, of the History Channel's Dogfights series.

In his later years, Vraciu declined invitations to write an autobiography; however, he agreed to be interviewed and participated in oral history projects at the Indiana Historical Society and the University of North Texas, which eventually resulted in the publication of his biography, Fighter Pilot: The World War II Career of Alex Vraciu (Indianapolis: Indiana Historical Society Press, 2010).

Death and legacy
Vraciu died on January 29, 2015, in West Sacramento, California, at the age of 96.

Historian Barrett Tillman acknowledged that Vraciu's mild-mannered and easy-going demeanor in his everyday life was atypical of his "steely aggressiveness" in combat. Ray Boomhower, Vraciu's biographer, commented that the fighter pilot and wartime hero was straightforward in their discussions, adding that Vraciu "always gave credit to those who had trained him."

Naval Air Facility El Centro became Vraciu Field in March 2019.

Naval Awards
Vraciu's decorations and awards include:

 United States Navy High Individual (Aerial Gunnery), 1957

Navy Cross citation

Commander [then Lieutenant, Junior Grade] Alexander Vraciu
U.S. Navy
Date Of Action: June 12, 1944
The President of the United States of America takes pleasure in presenting the Navy Cross to Commander [then Lieutenant, Junior Grade] Alexander Vraciu, United States Naval Reserve, for extraordinary heroism in operations against the enemy while serving as Pilot of a carrier-based Navy Fighter Plane in Fighting Squadron SIXTEEN (VF-16), attached to the U.S.S. LEXINGTON (CV-16), during operations in the vicinity of the Marianas Islands. On 12 June 1944 while participating in a daring strike against enemy shipping in a Saipan Harbor, Commander Vraciu dove through intense anti-aircraft fire to sink a large enemy merchant ship by a direct hit on its stern. On 14 June 1944 in the course of a strike against enemy positions in the islands of North of Saipan, Commander Vraciu sighted an enemy search plane. Despite an altitude disadvantage, he approached the plane so skillfully keeping in its "blind spot" that he was able to overhaul it and shoot it down. On 19 June 1944 with his Task Force under attack by a numerically superior force of enemy aircraft, Commander Vraciu struck furiously at the hostile bombers and, in the face of vigorous fighter opposition, succeeded in shooting down six thus contributing to the break-up of a concentrated enemy attack. On 20 June 1944 while flying escort for bomber and Torpedo Planes on a long-range strike against the Japanese Fleet, Commander Vraciu fearlessly closed with a group of hostile fighters, blasting one from the sky and severely damaging another to enable our forces to attack and disable a Japanese carrier. By his devotion to duty, Commander Vraciu reflected great credit upon himself and upheld the highest traditions of the United States Naval Service.

Notes

References

External links

Alexander Vraciu–Hellcat Ace
"The Plane and Pilot No. 2: Alex Vraciu", interview
The Fighter Collection

1918 births
2015 deaths
United States Navy pilots of World War II
American people of Romanian descent
American test pilots
American World War II flying aces
Aviators from Indiana
DePauw University alumni
People from East Chicago, Indiana
Military personnel from Indiana
Recipients of the Navy Cross (United States)
Recipients of the Distinguished Flying Cross (United States)
Recipients of the Air Medal
Shot-down aviators
United States Navy officers
Burials in California